Insup Lee is the Cecilia Fitler Moore Professor in the Department of Computer and Information Science at the University of Pennsylvania, United States. He is also the Director and co-founder of the PRECISE Center.

Lee obtained his B.S. in mathematics from the University of North Carolina at Chapel Hill in 1977, followed by his M.S. and Ph.D. in Computer Science at the University of Wisconsin-Madison in 1983. That same year, he joined the University of Pennsylvania as an assistant professor. Lee's research is predominantly focused on cyber-physical systems (CPS), real-time computing, high-confidence medical devices, formal methods and tools, and run-time verification. Much of his recent work has been related to CPS security, particularly for medical devices. Lee is also a Fellow of the ACM and IEEE.

Awards and honors
 Runtime Verification Test-of-Time Award, issued 2019 for ENTCS 2001 paper "Jav-MaC: Run-time Assurance Tool for Java Programs" (with Oleg Sokolsky, Sampath Kannan, Moonzoo Kim, and Mahesh Viswanathan).
 IEEE TC-RTS Outstanding Technical Achievement and Leadership Award, issued Dec 2008.
 The Edward M. Kennedy Award for Health Care Innovation, issued by CIMIT in 2007 for the Medical Device “PnP” Interoperability Team - Julian Goldman (leader), Dave Arney, Insup Lee, et al.

References

External links
Insup Lee homepage

University of Pennsylvania faculty
Formal methods people
American computer scientists
Fellows of the Association for Computing Machinery
Fellow Members of the IEEE
Year of birth missing (living people)
Living people